Charles Herbert is a former American child actor.

Charles Herbert may also refer to:

Charles Herbert (MP died 1557), Member of Parliament (MP) for Monmouthshire
Charles Herbert (MP died 1605), MP for Monmouth Boroughs
Charles Herbert (1743–1816), MP for Wilton
Charles Herbert (Royal Navy officer) (1774–1808), British Royal Navy officer
Charles Edward Herbert (1860–1929), Australian politician, judge and administrator

See also